Henri Heurtebise (14 February 1936 – 7 January 2023) was a French poet and editor. He was the founder of Éditions Multiples.

Biography
Heurtebise was born on 14 February 1936 in Bazens. He wrote his first poem in 1955 at the age of 19. He was a professor of classical literature at the Lycée de Muret from 1960 to 1996. He founded Éditions Multiples in 1970 alongside René Cazajous. In 1993, he created the "Fondamente" collection.

In 1980, Heurtebise moved to Longages and he founded the festival Ombres Blanches in Toulouse seven years later. The festival has since been celebrated at Toulouse's Cave Poésie bookstore.

Henri Heurtebise died in Damazan on 7 January 2023, at the age of 86.

Publications
Chantecri (1970)
Bref (1976)
Aires de parlerie (1980)
Le Menu Temps (1985)
D'automnes (1990)
L'Inépuisable Fini (1991)
Le Chevet (1994)
D'imaginie (1996)
Adam et Ève (1997)
Humaine humain (2000)
Monsieur de Non Juan (2000)
Filigranes (2004)
Chant profond (2005)

References

1936 births
2023 deaths
20th-century French poets
21st-century French poets
French editors
People from Lot-et-Garonne